Elia Abu Madi (also known as Elia D. Madey) (May 15, 1890 – November 23, 1957) was a Lebanese-born American poet.

Early life
Abu Madi was born in the village of Al-Muhaydithah, now part of Bikfaya, Lebanon, on May 15, 1890 to a Greek Orthodox Christian family. At the age of 11 he moved to Alexandria, Egypt where he worked with his uncle.

Career and Works
In 1911, Elia Abu Madi published his first collection of poems, Tazkar al-Madi. Shortly after, he was exiled by the Ottoman authorities and he left Egypt for the United States, where he settled in Cincinnati, Ohio. In 1916, he moved to New York City and began a career in journalism. In New York, Abu Madi met and worked with a number of Arab-American poets including Gibran Khalil Gibran. He married the daughter of Najeeb Diab, editor of the Arabic-language magazine Meraat-ul-Gharb, and became its chief editor in 1918. His second poetry collection, Diwan Iliya Abu Madi, was published in New York in 1919; his third and most important collection, Al-Jadawil ("The Streams"), appeared in 1927. His other books were Al-Khama'il ("The Thickets")(1940) and Tibr wa Turab (posthumous, 1960).

In 1929, Abu Madi founded his own periodical, As-Samir, in Brooklyn. It began as a monthly but after a few years it was published five times a week.

His poems are very well known among Arabs; poet, author, and journalist Gregory Orfalea wrote that "his poetry is as commonplace and memorized in the Arab world as that of Robert Frost is in ours."

See also

 New York Pen League

External links 

 A photo of Elia Abu Madi as a member of Al-Rabita Al-Qalamiyya (The Pen League).

Notes

Scholarly criticism 

Boullata, Issa J. "Iliya Abu Madi and the Riddle of Life in His Poetry" Journal of Arabic Literature, 1986; 17: 69-81. (journal article)
Nijland, Cornelis. "Religious Motifs and Themes in North American Mahjar Poetry" pp. 161–81 IN: Borg, Gert (ed. and introd.); De Moor, Ed (ed.); Representations of the Divine in Arabic Poetry. Amsterdam, Netherlands: Rodopi; 2001. 239 pp. (book article)
Romy, Cynthia Johnson. Diwan Al-Jadawil of Iliya Abu Madi (Masterʻs thesis, University of Arizona). Retrieved from http://hdl.handle.net/10150/291551

References

Sources

Salma Khadra Jayyusi, Trends and Movements in Modern Arabic Poetry, Brill, 1977.
Encyclopedia of Islam, Brill, 1980.
The New Anthology of American Poetry, eds. Steven Gould Axelrod, Camille Roman, Thomas J. Travisano, Rutgers University Press, 2005.

Poeti arabi a New York. Il circolo di Gibran, introduzione e traduzione di F. Medici, prefazione di A. Salem, Palomar, Bari 2009. . .

1890 births
Year of birth uncertain
1957 deaths
American people of Lebanese descent
20th-century American poets
20th-century Lebanese poets
Lebanese writers
American poets
American writers of Lebanese descent
American male journalists
Lebanese male poets
20th-century American male writers
American male non-fiction writers
American Arabic-language poets
Emigrants from the Ottoman Empire to the United States